Hylyphantes is a genus of dwarf spiders that was first described by Eugène Louis Simon in 1884. It is distinct from related genera by a pair of spiral copulatory ducts in the female, which are matched by a turbinated embolus in the male. Both sexes are similar in appearance; the male has no modifications.

Species
 it contains five species, found in China, Japan, Korea, Laos, Myanmar, Russia, Thailand, and Vietnam:
Hylyphantes geniculatus Tu & Li, 2003 – China
Hylyphantes graminicola (Sundevall, 1830) – Europe, Russia (Europe to Far East), China, Korea, Japan, Myanmar, Laos, Thailand, Vietnam
Hylyphantes nigritus (Simon, 1881) (type) – Europe, Caucasus, Russia (Europe to Far East), China
Hylyphantes spirellus Tu & Li, 2005 – China
Hylyphantes tanikawai Ono & Saito, 2001 – Japan (Ryukyu Is.)

See also
 List of Linyphiidae species (A–H)

References

Araneomorphae genera
Linyphiidae
Palearctic spiders
Spiders of Asia